The 2021 AIBA World Boxing Championships were held in Belgrade, Serbia from 25 October to 6 November. Belgrade was picked to host the championships for the second time; the original 2021 contract with New Delhi was cancelled due to a disagreement between AIBA and the Boxing Federation of India over hosting fees. AIBA also demanded the BFI pay a cancellation penalty of US$500,000.

For the first time in AIBA’s 75-year history, medal winners were awarded prize money; gold medallists earn $100,000, silver medallists $50,000, and bronze medallists $25,000. The overall prize fund was worth $2.6 million.

Medal summary

Medal table

Medalists

Controversies
The Kosovo boxing team was prevented from competing at the tournament despite Serbia's hosting contract requiring Serbia to allow all teams to compete. (The contract further requires that all teams be allowed to compete under their own flags and explicitly includes Kosovo; AIBA recognizes the Kosovo Boxing Federation as a full member.) Two days prior to the tournament, the Kosovo boxing team was denied entry into Serbia at border control, effectively shutting them out of the tournament. During negotiations between AIBA and Serbia, Serbia stated to AIBA that Kosovo would not be allowed to compete except under the AIBA flag; this was rejected by Kosovo. One day prior to the tournament, AIBA suggested a compromise to Serbia where Kosovo would compete under "a neutral flag" (similar to Russia's situation); this was rejected by Serbia.

In December 2021 after the tournament, the International Olympic Committee sent a letter to Serbia condemning the incident.

Participating nations 
510 athletes from 84 countries and the IBA Fair Chance Team participated in the championships:

  (3)
  (5)
 IBA Fair Chance Team (10)
  (1)
  (13)
  (1)
  (3)
  (3)
  (6)
  (2)
  (3)
  (2)
  (2)
  (10)
  (8)
  (8)
  (2)
  (9)
  (3)
  (2)
  (1)
  (3)
  (1)
  (9)
  (1)
  (3)
  (4)
  (5)
  (9)
  (4)
  (1)
  (13)
  (10)
  (1)
  (4)
  (10)
  (13)
  (12)
  (7)
  (1)
  (8)
  (4)
  (1)
  (1)
  (1)
 Thailand Boxing Federation (10)
  (8)
  (10)
  (3)
  (11)
  (1)
  (9)
  (3)
  (3)
  (6)
  (8)
  (10)
  (4)
  (1)
  (9)
  (2)
  (3)
  (6)
  (7)
  (13)
  (4)
  (10)
  (7)
  (4)
  (11)
  (8)
  (1)
  (8)
  (2)
  (2)
  (3)
  (8)
 Russian Boxing Federation (13)
  (2)
  (6)
  (7)
  (12)
  (5)
  (13)
  (13)

References

External links
Team Delegation Handbook
AIBA Website
Results Book

 
AIBA World Boxing Championships
International sports competitions in Belgrade
AIBA World Boxing Championships
AIBA World Boxing Championships
AIBA
AIBA